This is a list of renewable energy topics by country and territory.  These links can be used to compare developments in renewable energy in different countries and territories and to help and encourage new writers to participate in writing about developments in their own countries or countries of interest.

The list refers to renewable energy in general, as well as solar power, wind power, geothermal energy, biofuel, and hydropower. As of 2013, China, Germany, and Japan, and India, four of the world's largest economies generate more electricity from renewables than from nuclear power.

Based on REN21's 2014 report, renewables supplied 19% of humans' global energy consumption. This energy consumption is divided as 9% coming from traditional biomass, 4.2% as heat energy (non-biomass), 3.8% hydro electricity and 2% is electricity from wind, solar, geothermal, and biomass.

China is the world's largest producer of hydroelectricity, followed by Canada, Brazil, India, U.S and Russia. Wind power capacity is growing at the rate of 26% annually, and is widely used in Europe, Asia, and the United States. Wind power accounts for approximately 30% of electricity use in Denmark, 20% in Portugal, and 18% in Spain.

Long considered climate policy’s problem case due to its large population and fast growing economy, India is exceeding targets and breaking records and has become the fastest in adoption of clean and renewable energy.

Special renewable energy figures
PV power stations are popular in Japan, China and the United States. The world's largest geothermal power installation is The Geysers in California, with a rated capacity of 750 MW. Brazil has one of the largest renewable energy programs in the world, involving production of ethanol fuel from sugar cane, and ethanol now provides 18 percent of the country's automotive fuel. Ethanol fuel is also widely available in the United States. Plug-in electric vehicles in Norway reached a market share of 22.4% in 2015, the highest in the world.

While many renewable energy projects are large-scale, renewable technologies are also suited to developing countries, where energy is often crucial in human development. Small solar PV systems provide electricity to a few million households, and micro-hydro configured into mini-grids serves many more.

Lists
List of countries by renewable electricity production

Regions

Countries and territories

References

 
 
Sustainability lists